The Daoguang Emperor (16 September 1782 – 26 February 1850), also known by his temple name Emperor Xuanzong of Qing, born Mianning, was the seventh emperor of the Qing dynasty, and the sixth Qing emperor to rule over China proper, reigning from 1820 to 1850. His reign was marked by "external disaster and internal rebellion." These included the First Opium War and the beginning of the Taiping Rebellion which nearly brought down the dynasty. The historian Jonathan Spence characterizes the Daoguang Emperor as a "well meaning but ineffective man" who promoted officials who "presented a purist view even if they had nothing to say about the domestic and foreign problems surrounding the dynasty."

Early years 

The Daoguang Emperor was born in the Forbidden City, Beijing, in 1782, and was given the name Mianning. It was later changed to Minning when he became emperor. The first character of his private name was changed from Mian to Min to avoid the relatively common character Mian. This novelty was introduced by his grandfather, the reigning Qianlong Emperor, who thought it was inappropriate to use a common character in the emperor's private name due to the longstanding practice of naming taboo.

Mianning was the second son of Prince Yongyan, the 15th son and heir of the Qianlong Emperor. Even though he was Yongyan's second son, he was first in line after Prince Yongyan to his grandfather's throne. This was because according to the dishu system, his mother, Lady Hitara, was Yongyan's primary spouse whereas his elder brother was born to Yongyan's concubine. Mianning was favored by his grandfather, the Qianlong Emperor. He frequently accompanied his grandfather on hunting trips. On one such trip, at the age of nine, Mianning successfully hunted a deer, which greatly amused the Qianlong Emperor. The emperor would abdicate five years after that incident, in 1796, when Mianning was 14. Mianning’s father Prince Yongyan was then enthroned as the Jiaqing Emperor, after which he made Lady Hitara (Mianning's mother) his empress consort. The elderly Qianlong would live three more years in retirement before dying in 1799, aged 87, when Mianning was 17.

In 1813, while he was still a prince, Mianning also played a vital role in repelling and killing Eight Trigrams invaders who stormed the Forbidden City.

Reign

Khoja rebellion in Xinjiang 

In September 1820, at the age of 38, Mianning inherited the throne after the Jiaqing Emperor died suddenly of unknown causes. He became the first Qing emperor who was the eldest legitimate son of his father. Now known as the Daoguang Emperor, he inherited a declining empire with Westerners encroaching upon the borders of China. His era name, "Daoguang", means "radiant path". The Daoguang Emperor had been ruling for six years when the exiled heir to the Khojas, Jahangir Khoja, attacked Xinjiang from Kokand in the Afaqi Khoja revolts. By the end of 1826, the former Qing cities of Kashgar, Yarkand, Khotan, and Yangihissar had all fallen to the rebels. After a friend betrayed him in March 1827, Khoja was sent to Beijing in an iron litter and subsequently executed, while the Qing Empire regained control of their lost territory. The Uyghur Muslim Sayyid and Naqshbandi Sufi rebel of the Afaqi suborder, Jahangir Khoja was sliced to death (Lingchi) in 1828 by the Manchus for leading a rebellion against the Qing.

First Opium War 

During the Daoguang Emperor's reign, China experienced major problems with opium, which was imported into China by British merchants. Opium had started to trickle into China during the reign of the Yongzheng Emperor, but was limited to approximately 200 chests annually. By the time of the Qianlong era, this amount had increased to 1,000 chests, 4,000 chests by the Jiaqing era and more than 30,000 chests during the Daoguang era. 

The Daoguang Emperor issued many imperial edicts banning opium in the 1820s and 1830s, which were carried out by Lin Zexu, whom he appointed as an Imperial Commissioner to Canton. Lin Zexu's efforts to halt the spread of opium in China led directly to the First Opium War. With China losing the war, Lin Zexu was made a scapegoat. The Daoguang Emperor removed his authority and banished him to Yili. The loss in the war exposed Qing China's technological and military inferiority to European powers, this led China in being forced to cede Hong Kong to the British in the Treaty of Nanjing in August 1842, and also pay a hefty indemnity which led the treasury desperate for funds. Meanwhile, in the Himalayas, the Sikh Empire attempted an occupation of Tibet but was defeated in the Sino-Sikh war (1841–1842).

Anti-Christianity 
In 1811, a clause sentencing Europeans to death for spreading Catholicism had been added to the statute called "Prohibitions Concerning Sorcerers and Sorceresses" (禁止師巫邪術) in the Great Qing Legal Code. Protestants hoped that the Qing government would discriminate between Protestantism and Catholicism, since the law mentioned the latter by name, but after Protestant missionaries gave Christian books to Chinese people in 1835 and 1836, the Daoguang Emperor demanded to know who were the "traitorous natives" in Guangzhou who had supplied them with books.

Noble titles

The Daoguang Emperor granted the title of "Wujing Boshi" to the descendants of Ran Qiu.

Death and legacy

The Daoguang Emperor died on 26 February 1850 at the Old Summer Palace, 8 km/5 miles northwest of Beijing, being the last Qing emperor to pass away in that Palace before it was burnt down by Anglo-French troops during the Second Opium War, a decade later. He was succeeded by his eldest surviving son, Yizhu, who was later enthroned as the Xianfeng Emperor. The Daoguang Emperor failed to understand the intention or determination of the Europeans, or the basic economics of a war on drugs. Although the Europeans were outnumbered and thousands of miles away from logistical support in their native countries, they could bring far superior firepower to bear at any point of contact along the Chinese coast. The Qing government was highly dependent on the continued flow of taxes from southern China via the Grand Canal, which the British expeditionary force easily cut off at Zhenjiang.

The Daoguang Emperor ultimately had a poor understanding of the British and the industrial revolution that Britain and Western Europe had undergone, preferring to turn a blind eye to the rest of the world, though the distance from China to Europe most likely played a part. It was said that the emperor did not even know where Britain was located in the world. His 30-year reign saw rising economic tensions, sectarian instability and foreign interventions which would eventually lead to the collapse of the Qing dynasty in 1911.

The Daoguang Emperor was interred in the Mu (慕; lit. "Longing" or "Admiration") mausoleum complex, which is part of the Western Qing Tombs, 120 km southwest of Beijing.

Family 

Empress
 Empress Xiaomucheng, of the Niohuru clan (孝穆成皇后 鈕祜祿氏; 1781 – 17 February 1808), fifth cousin eight times removed    Titles: Primary Consort of the Second Prince (二皇子福晋) 
 Empress Xiaoshencheng, of the Tunggiya clan (孝慎成皇后 佟佳氏; 5 July 1792 – 16 June 1833)   Titles: Second Primary Consort of the Second Prince (二皇子继福晋) → Princess Consort Zhi of the First Rank (智亲王妃) → Empress (皇后)
 Princess Duanmin of the First Rank (端憫固倫公主; 29 July 1813 – 7 December 1819), first daughter

 Empress Xiaoquancheng, of the Niohuru clan (孝全成皇后 鈕祜祿氏; 24 March 1808 – 13 February 1840)   Titles: Noble Lady Quan (全貴人) → Imperial Concubine Quan (全嬪) → Consort Quan (全妃) → Noble Consort Quan (全貴妃) → Imperial Noble Consort (皇貴妃) → Empress (皇后)
 Miscarriage (2 January 1824)
 Princess Duanshun of the First Rank (端順固倫公主; 8 April 1825 – 27 December 1835), third daughter
 Princess Shou'an of the First Rank (壽安固倫公主; 12 May 1826 – 24 March 1860), fourth daughter
 Married Demchüghjab (德穆楚克扎布; d. 1865) of the Naiman Borjigit clan on 15 November 1841
 Yizhu, the Xianfeng Emperor (文宗 奕詝; 17 July 1831 – 22 August 1861), fourth son

 Empress Xiaojingcheng, of the Khorchin Borjigit clan (孝靜成皇后 博爾濟吉特氏; 19 June 1812 – 21 August 1855), fifth cousin    Titles: Noble Lady Jing (靜貴人) → Imperial Concubine Jing (靜嬪) → Consort Jing (靜妃) → Noble Consort Jing (靜貴妃) → Imperial Noble Consort (皇貴妃) → Imperial Noble Consort Dowager Kangci (康慈皇貴太妃) → Empress Dowager Kangci (康慈皇太后)
 Yigang, Prince Shunhe of the Second Rank (順和郡王 奕綱; 22 November 1826 – 5 March 1827), second son
 Miscarriage at four months (28 June 1828)
 Yiji, Prince Huizhi of the Second Rank (慧質郡王 奕繼; 2 December 1829 – 22 January 1830), third son
 Princess Shou'en of the First Rank (壽恩固倫公主; 20 January 1831 – 15 May 1859), sixth daughter
 Married Jingshou (景壽; 1829–1889) of the Manchu Fuca clan in May/June 1845, and had issue.
 Yixin, Prince Gongzhong of the First Rank (恭忠親王 奕䜣; 11 January 1833 – 29 May 1898), sixth son

Imperial Noble Consort

 Imperial Noble Consort Zhuangshun, of the Uya clan (莊順皇貴妃 烏雅氏; 29 November 1822 – 13 December 1866)   Titles: Noble Lady Lin (琳貴人) → First Class Attendant Xiu (秀常在) → Noble Lady Lin (琳貴人) → Imperial Concubine Lin (琳嬪) → Consort Lin (琳妃) → Noble Consort Lin (琳貴妃) → Noble Consort Dowager Lin (琳貴太妃) → Grand Dowager Imperial Noble Consort Lin (琳太皇貴太妃)
 Yixuan, Prince Chunxian of the First Rank (醇賢親王 奕譞; 16 October 1840 – 1 January 1891), seventh son
 Princess Shouzhuang of the First Rank (壽莊固倫公主; 24 March 1842 – 11 March 1884), ninth daughter
 Married Dehui (德徽; d. 1859) of the Bolod (博罗特) clan in December 1859 or January 1860 and had issue (daughter)
 Yihe, Prince Zhongduan of the Second Rank (鐘端郡王 奕詥; 14 March 1844 – 17 December 1868), eighth son
 Yihui, Prince Fujing of the Second Rank (孚敬郡王 奕譓; 15 November 1845 – 22 March 1877), ninth son
 Miscarriage (1848)

Noble Consort

 Noble Consort Tong, of the Šumuru clan (彤貴妃 舒穆魯氏; 3 June 1817 – 9 November 1875)   Titles: Noble Lady Mu (睦貴人) → Imperial Concubine Tong (彤嬪) → Consort Tong (彤妃) → Noble Consort Tong (彤貴妃) → Noble Lady Tong (彤貴人) → Dowager Imperial Concubine Tong (彤太嬪) → Grand Dowager Noble Consort Tong (彤太貴太妃)
 Seventh daughter (30 July 1840 – 27 January 1845)
 Princess Shouxi of the Second Rank (壽禧和碩公主; 7 January 1842 – 10 September 1866), eighth daughter
 Married Jalafungga (扎拉豐阿; d. 1898) of the Manchu Niohuru clan in November/December 1863
 Tenth daughter (4 May 1844 – 26 February 1845)

 Noble Consort Jia, of the Gogiya clan (佳貴妃 郭佳氏; 21 November 1816 – 24 May 1890)   Titles: Noble Lady Jia (佳贵人) → Imperial Concubine Jia (佳嬪) → Noble Lady Jia (佳贵人) → Dowager Imperial Concubine Jia (佳太嬪) → Grand Consort Dowager Jia (佳太皇妃) → Grand Dowager Noble Consort Jia (佳太貴太妃)
 Noble Consort Cheng, of the Niohuru clan (成貴妃 鈕祜祿氏; 10 March 1813 – 10 May 1888)   Titles: Noble Lady Cheng (成貴人) → First Class Female Attendant Yu (餘常在) → Noble Lady Cheng (成貴人) → Imperial Concubine Cheng (成嬪) → Noble Lady Cheng (成貴人) → Dowager Imperial Concubine Cheng (成太嬪) → Grand Consort Dowager Cheng (成太妃) → Grand Dowager Noble Consort Cheng (成太貴太妃)

Consort

 Consort He, of the Hoifa Nara clan (和妃 輝發那拉氏; d. 18 May 1836)  Titles: Lady-in-waiting (官女子) → Secondary Consort of the Second Prince (二皇子侧妃) → Secondary Consort of Prince Zhi (智亲王侧妃) → Imperial Concubine He (和嬪) → Consort He (和妃)
 Yiwei, Prince Yinzhi of the Second Rank (隱志郡王 奕緯; 16 May 1808 – 23 May 1831), first son and heir presumptive for the greater part of his father's early reign

 Consort Xiang, of the Niohuru clan (祥妃 鈕祜祿氏; 9 February 1808 – 15 February 1861)  Titles: Noble Lady Xiang (祥貴人) → Imperial Concubine Xiang (祥嬪) → Consort Xiang (祥妃) → Noble Lady Xiang (祥貴人) → Dowager Imperial Concubine Xiang (祥太嬪) → Grand Consort Dowager Xiang (祥太皇妃)
 Second daughter (2 March 1825 – 27 August 1825)
 Princess Shouzang of the Second Rank (壽臧和碩公主; 15 November 1829 – 9 August 1856), fifth daughter
 Married Enchong (恩崇; d. 1864) of the Manchu Namdulu (那木都魯) clan on 3 January 1843
 Yicong, Prince Dunqin of the First Rank (惇勤親王 奕誴; 23 July 1831 – 18 February 1889), fifth son; adopted by his uncle Miankai (綿愷) early on

 Consort Chang, of the Hešeri clan (常妃 赫舍里氏; 31 December 1808 – 10 May 1860)   Titles: Noble Lady Zhen (珍貴人) → Imperial Concubine Zhen (珍嬪) → Consort Zhen (珍妃) → Imperial Concubine Zhen (珍嬪) → Noble Lady Chang (常貴人) → Dowager Imperial Concubine Chang (常太嬪)

Imperial Concubine

 Imperial Concubine Tian, of the Fuca clan (恬嬪 富察氏; 15 April 1789 – 21 August 1845)  Titles: Secondary Consort of the Second Prince (二皇子侧妃) → Secondary Consort of Prince Zhi (智亲王侧妃) → Imperial Concubine Tian (恬嬪)
 Imperial Concubine Shun, of the Hoifa Nara clan (順嬪 那拉氏; 21 March 1809 – 11 April 1868)  Titles: First Class Female Attendant Shun (顺常在) → Noble Lady Shun (顺贵人) → First Class Female Attendant Shun (顺常在) → Dowager Noble Lady Shun (顺太贵人)→ Grand Dowager Imperial Concubine Shun (顺太嬪)
 Imperial Concubine Yu, of the Shang clan (豫嬪 尚氏; 20 December 1816 – 24 September 1897)  Titles: First Class Female Attendant Ling (玲常在) → Second Class Female Attendant Shang (尚答应) → Dowager First Class Female Attendant Shang (尚太常在) → Grand Dowager Noble Lady Shang (尚太贵人)→ Grand Dowager Imperial Concubine Yu (豫太嬪)
 Imperial Concubine Heng, of the Cai clan (恆嬪 蔡氏; d. 28 May 1876)  Titles: Noble Lady Yi (宜貴人) → First Class Female Attendant Yi (宜常在) → Second Class Female Attendant (答应) → Dowager First Class Female Attendant (太常在) → Dowager Noble Lady (太贵人) → Grand Dowager Imperial Concubine Heng (恆太嬪)

Noble Lady

 Noble Lady Ping, of the Zhao clan (平貴人 趙氏; d. 5 May 1823)Titles: Noble Lady Ping (平貴人)
 Noble Lady Li, of the Li clan (李貴人 李氏; 25 November 1827 –  26 March 1872)Titles: First-Class Female Attendant Yi (意常在) → Second-Class Female Attendant Li (李答應) → First-Class Female Attendant (常在) → Noble Lady Li (李貴人)
 Noble Lady Na, of the Hoifa Nara clan (那貴人 輝發那拉氏; 5 August 1825 – 9 September  1865)Titles: First-Class Female Attendant Lu (琭常在) → Noble Lady Lu (琭貴人) → First-Class Female Attendant Lu (琭常在) → Second-Class Female Attendant Lu (琭答應) → First-Class Female Attendant Lu (琭常在) → Second-Class Female Attendant Na (那答應) → First-Class Female Attendant Na (那常在) → Noble Lady Na (那貴人)
 Noble Lady Ding, of the Sun clan (定貴人 孫氏; d. 24 January 1843)Titles: Noble Lady Ding (定貴人)

Second-Class Female Attendant

 Second-Class Female Attendant Mu, of the Heseri clan (睦答應 赫舍里氏; d. 2 June 1832)Titles: Noble Lady Mu (睦貴人) → Imperial Concubine Mu (睦嬪) → Noble Lady Mu (睦貴人) → First-Class Female Attendant Mu (睦常在) → Second-Class Female Attendant Mu (睦答應) → Lady-in-waiting  (官女子) → Second-Class Female Attendant Mu (睦答應)

Lady-in-waiting

 Lady-in-waiting, of the Liu clan (劉官女子 劉氏; d. 1843)Titles: First-Class Female Attendant (曼常在) → Second-Class Female Attendant (劉答應) →Lady-in-waiting (官女子)

Ancestry

Popular culture 
 Portrayed by Lo Chun-shun in The Rise and Fall of Qing Dynasty (1988)
 Portrayed by Du Zhiguo in Sigh of His Highness (2006)
 Portrayed by Sunny Chan in Curse of the Royal Harem (2011)
 Portrayed by Nono Yeung in Succession War (2018)

See also 

 Family tree of Chinese monarchs (late)
 Treaty of Nanjing (1842)

References

Citations

Sources

Further reading 
 Jane Kate Leonard. Controlling from Afar: The Daoguang Emperor's Management of the Grand Canal Crisis, 1824–1826. Michigan Monographs in Chinese Studies.  Ann Arbor: Center for Chinese Studies, University of Michigan, 1996. . Shows the Daoguang Emperor in a competent and effective mode when dealing with a crisis early in his reign.
 Pierre-Etienne Will,  "Views of the Realm in Crisis: Testimonies on Imperial Audiences in the Nineteenth Century." Late Imperial China 29, no. 1S (2008): 125–59. JSTOR Link. Uses transcripts of imperial audiences to present Daoguang as more a victim of circumstances than the bumbling administrator in many accounts.
  The only biography of the Daoguang Emperor; written by a missionary and contemporary.
 Evelyn S. Rawski, The Last Emperors: A Social History of Qing Imperial Institutions (Berkeley: University of Californian Press, 2001) .
Daily life in the Forbidden City, Wan Yi, Wang Shuqing, Lu Yanzhen. .

External links 
 

1782 births
1850 deaths
Qing dynasty emperors
19th-century Chinese monarchs
1820s in China
1830s in China
1840s in China
Jiaqing Emperor's sons
People from Beijing